Aimee Buchanan (born June 11, 1993) is an American-Israeli former competitive figure skater who competed in ladies' singles for Israel. She is a two-time Israeli national champion and competed in the team event at the 2018 Winter Olympics.

Early life 
Buchanan was born and grew up in Boston, Massachusetts, and subsequently lived in Lexington, Massachusetts, and Euless, Texas. Buchanan's mother Wendy is Jewish and is from Israel, as are both of her maternal grandparents, and Buchanan is and also identifies as Jewish. She attended synagogue on the High Holidays and Hebrew school for a few years, before sports became too demanding. She attended Endicott College and the United States Sports Academy, studying for a B.S. in Strength and Conditioning. In 2014, she became a dual American-Israeli citizen.

Skating career
Buchanan began figure skating at age 4, but she did not start seriously training until age 19. While she lived in Boston, she trained at the Colonial Figure Skating Club in Boxborough, Massachusetts, with coaches Julie Graham-Eavzan and Chad Brennan, while her programs were choreographed by former Olympian Sheryl Franks.  In November 2013, she came in second at the New England Regional Figure Skating Championships Newington, Connecticut.

She relocated to Texas to train with figure skating coaches Peter and Darlene Cain.

Buchanan has represented Israel three times at the European Figure Skating Championships, and was the Israeli national ladies champion in 2016. In August 2017, she had foot surgery to remove a bursa sac. She was not able to enter the Olympics single women's qualifier competition in Germany in 2017, because the qualifier was scheduled to take place on Yom Kippur.

She competed for Israel at the 2018 Winter Olympics in team figure skating in Pyeongchang, South Korea. Buchanan placed 10th in the woman's short program of the team event with a score of 46.30, an improvement of 1.23 points as compared to her personal best before that program. Israel finished in 8th place, ahead of South Korea and France, and did not qualify for the finals of the team event.

Buchanan announced her retirement from competitive skating in June 2019 after having three ankle surgeries and two injections to help with injuries. Doctors subsequently advised her against further training at a competitive level.

Programs

Results 
CS: Challenger Series; JGP: Junior Grand Prix

For Israel

For the United States

References

External links
 
 
"Figure skater Aimee Buchanan gears up for her Olympic debut," NBC (video), February 10, 2018.

1993 births
American female single skaters
Living people
Figure skaters at the 2018 Winter Olympics
Olympic figure skaters of Israel
Israeli female single skaters
Jewish American sportspeople
Jewish Israeli sportspeople
American emigrants to Israel
American people of Israeli descent
People from Lexington, Massachusetts
Sportspeople from Middlesex County, Massachusetts
People from Euless, Texas
Sportspeople from the Dallas–Fort Worth metroplex
Endicott College alumni
United States Sports Academy alumni
21st-century American Jews
21st-century American women